The Cry! is an album by saxophonists Prince Lasha and Sonny Simmons which was recorded in late 1962 and released on the Contemporary label.

Reception 

Allmusic awarded the album 4 stars with its review by Alex Henderson stating: "This album is quirky and dissonant, but it isn't harsh or confrontational. In avant-garde circles, The Cry! went down in history as one of Lasha's finest accomplishments -- and deservedly so". On All About Jazz, Dave Rickert described the music as "fine free jazz that succeeds at being adventurous without being demanding".

Track listing 
All compositions by Prince Lasha and Sonny Simmons
 "Congo Call" - 5:02
 "Bojangles" - 7:00
 "Green and Gold" - 4:52
 "Ghost of the Past" - 4:59 		
 "Red's Mood" - 5:04 		
 "Juanita" - 5:32 		
 "Lost Generation" - 5:15 		
 "A.Y." - 4:46

Personnel 
Prince Lasha - alto saxophone, flute
Sonny Simmons - alto saxophone
Gary Peacock, Mark Proctor (except tracks 2, 7, 8)  - bass
Gene Stone - drums

References 

Prince Lasha albums
Sonny Simmons albums
1963 debut albums
Contemporary Records albums